Big Brother Mzansi, formerly known as Big Brother South Africa, is a television series in South Africa produced by M-Net and Endemol. As of 2022, it has had a total of six seasons. Big Brother South Africa had two seasons, and a celebrity season in between. The first season aired in 2001 and the second in 2002. Both seasons were directed by Leon Coetzer and hosted by Mark Pilgrim.

In 2014, the show was rebooted and rebranded Big Brother Mzansi. This return show brought with it a new host, Lungile Radu, and a new production network, M-Net's Mzansi Magic. The second season was broadcast in 2015.

Following a six-year hiatus, a third season of Big Brother Mzansi was announced which premiered on 23 January 2022 with a new host, Lawrence Maleka.

In October 2022, a special edition in the Big Brother Africa franchise combining Big Brother Mzansi and Big Brother Naija called Big Brother Titans, where South Africa will face off against Nigeria, was announced, premiering on 15 January 2023.

Seasons

Big Brother South Africa

Season 1
Start Date: 26 August 2001
End Date: 9 December 2001
Duration: 106 days

Nominations Table

 Lynne McCarthy, pulled out of first season days before recording to pursue international modeling contract. McCarthy returned to South Africa a few years later to star in local soaps EGOLI and Isidingo.

Celebrity Season

Start Date: 23 June 2002
End Date: 30 June 2002
Duration: 8 days

The Finalists: 4 - Bill (The Winner), Jo-Ann (Runner-up), Bad Boy (3rd) & Danny (4th)
Evicted Housemates: 5 - Gloria, Helen, Kabelo, Neil & TK
Voluntary Exits: 2 - Sam & Emmanuel

Season 2
Start Date: 28 July 2002
End Date: 13 October 2002
Duration: 79 days

Nominations table

Big Brother Mzansi

Season 1

On 12 June 2013, M-Net announced that its local brand, Mzansi Magic, would produce another South African edition of Big Brother, with the show being rebranded as Big Brother Mzansi, which was set to air in January 2014. It marked the South African editions return, 12 years after the previous season ended.
It began on 2 February 2014. Lungile Radu was the host. After 63 days Mandla emerged as the winner of this season.

Season 2

Due to success of the previous season, Big Brother Mzansi 2015 came back. The year's theme was Double Trouble. Housemates entered the house in pairs and compete against each other for R2 Million. The show lasted for 56 days. Lungile Radu was back as host. After 56 days Ntombi and Ace emerged as the winners of the show.

Season 3

After a six-year hiatus, the third season of Big Brother Mzansi premiered on 23 January 2022 with a new theme, Beke Le Beke. It also came with a new host, Lawrence Maleka. After 71 days on 3 April 2022, Mphowabadimo was declared the winner and received R2 million, while Gash1 was the runner-up.

Trivia
Total number of days on air: 312 days
Total number of housemates: 74 Housemates
Total number of housemates that walked: 6 Housemates
Total number of ejections : 3 Housemates

See also
 Big Brother television series

Big Brother Mzansi housemates will be back on your screens==References==

Big Brother Naija Season 7 2022==External links==

South Africa
South African reality television series
M-Net original programming
2001 South African television series debuts
2000s South African television series